Dyabyla (Cabıla) is a rural locality (a selo) and the administrative center of Ozhulunsky Rural Okrug in Churapchinsky District of the Sakha Republic, Russia, located  from Churapcha, the administrative center of the district. Its population as of the 2010 Census was 1,112; up from 1,042 recorded in the 2002 Census.

Geography
The selo is located in a flat area by the Tatta river.

References

Notes

Sources
Official website of the Sakha Republic. Registry of the Administrative-Territorial Divisions of the Sakha Republic. Churapchinsky District. 

Rural localities in Churapchinsky District